Ljupčo Kmetovski (born 7 August 1972) is a Macedonian football coach and former player. He is the goalkeeping coach for OL Reign of the National Women's Soccer League.

International career
He made his senior debut and played his only international for Macedonia in a November 2005 friendly match away against Liechtenstein.

Achievements
As player:
FK Cementarnica 55 Skopje
Macedonian Cup: 1
Winner: 2002–03
FK Rabotnički Skopje
First Macedonian Football League: 1
Winner: 2007–08
Macedonian Cup: 1
Winner: 2007–08
FK Teteks
Macedonian Cup: 1
Winner: 2009–10
Second Macedonian Football League: 1
Winner: 2008–09

As coach:
FK Teteks Tetovo
Macedonian Cup:1
Winner: 2009–10
FK Metalurg Skopje
Macedonian Cup: 1
Winner: 2010–11

References

External links
 
Macedonian Football 

1972 births
Living people
Footballers from Skopje
Association football goalkeepers
Macedonian footballers
North Macedonia international footballers
FK Rabotnički players
FK Cementarnica 55 players
FK Vardar players
FK Milano Kumanovo players
FK Teteks players
Macedonian First Football League players
Macedonian football managers
FK Teteks managers
OL Reign non-playing staff
Macedonian expatriate sportspeople in the United States
Macedonian expatriate football managers
Expatriate soccer managers in the United States
Association football goalkeeping coaches